The Arab League Ambassador in Beijing is the official representative of the Arab League to the Government of the People's Republic of China.

List of representatives

See also 
 Sino-Arab relations

References 

Ambassadors of the Arab League
Arab League